Pemetrexed, sold under the brand name Alimta among others, is a chemotherapy medication for the treatment of pleural mesothelioma and non-small cell lung cancer (NSCLC)..

It is available as a generic medication.

Medical use
In February 2004, the U.S. Food and Drug Administration (FDA) approved pemetrexed for treatment of malignant pleural mesothelioma, a type of tumor of the mesothelium, the thin layer of tissue that covers many of the internal organs, in combination with cisplatin for patients whose disease is either unresectable or who are not otherwise candidates for curative surgery. In September 2008, the FDA granted approval as a first-line treatment, in combination with cisplatin, against locally advanced and metastatic non-small cell lung cancer (NSCLC) in patients with non-squamous histology.

Carboplatin
Pemetrexed is also recommended in combination with carboplatin and pembrolizumab for the first-line treatment of advanced non-small cell lung cancer. However, the relative efficacy or toxicity of pemetrexed-cisplatin versus pemetrexed-carboplatin has not been established beyond what is generally thought about cisplatin or carboplatin doublet drug therapy.

Supplementation
Patients are recommended to take folic acid and vitamin B12 supplement even if levels are normal when they are on pemetrexed therapy. (In clinical trials for mesothelioma, folic acid and B12 supplementation reduced the frequency of adverse events.)  It is also recommended for patients to be on a glucocorticoid (e.g. dexamethasone) on the day prior, day of, and day after pemetrexed infusion to avoid skin rashes.

Side effects
Pemetrexed, whether used alone or in combination with cisplatin, has these side effects:
 Low blood cell counts, as measured by a complete blood count. This is a dose-limiting toxicity.
 Mental fatigue and sleepiness. Fatigue can be reduced through an off-label prescription of modafinil.
 Nausea and vomiting.  Pemetrexed's emetogenic effects are managed with prophylactic antiemetics.
 Diarrhea
 Oral mucositis (mouth, throat, or lip sores). Oral ulcers can be mitigated by proper oral hygiene, including rinsing of the mouth with salt water following consumption of food or drink.
 Loss of appetite
 Skin rash. Physician-prescribed glucocorticoids administered on the day prior, day of, and day after infusion typically avoid skin rashes.
 Constipation

Mechanism of action

Pemetrexed is chemically similar to folic acid and is in the class of chemotherapy drugs called folate antimetabolites.  It works by inhibiting three enzymes used in purine and pyrimidine synthesis—thymidylate synthase (TS), dihydrofolate reductase (DHFR), and glycinamide ribonucleotide formyltransferase (GARFT). By inhibiting the formation of precursor purine and pyrimidine nucleotides, pemetrexed prevents the formation of DNA and RNA, which are required for the growth and survival of both normal cells and cancer cells.

Society and culture

Economics

Brand names
In February 2020, Pemfexy was approved for use in the United States.

Research
A Phase III study showed benefits of maintenance use of pemetrexed for non-squamous NSCLC. Activity has been shown in malignant peritoneal mesothelioma.

References

External links
 
 
 
 

Mammalian dihydrofolate reductase inhibitors
Eli Lilly and Company brands
Pyrrolopyrimidines
Benzamides
Antifolates
Thymidylate synthase inhibitors
Purines